Rochegda is a rural locality (a settlement) and the administrative center of Rochegodskoye Rural Settlement of Vinogradovsky District, Arkhangelsk Oblast, Russia. The population was 1989 as of 2010. There are 21 streets.

Geography 
Rochegda is located 45 km southeast of Bereznik (the district's administrative centre) by road. Pleso is the nearest rural locality.

References 

Rural localities in Vinogradovsky District